Girish Bhandari is an Indian politician and a member of the Indian National Congress party.

Political career
He became an MLA in 2013 Madhya Pradesh Legislative Assembly election.

Personal life
He is married to Jaya Bhandari and has a son and a daughter.

See also
Madhya Pradesh Legislative Assembly
2013 Madhya Pradesh Legislative Assembly election

References

External links

Madhya Pradesh MLAs 2013–2018
Indian National Congress politicians from Madhya Pradesh
Living people
1965 births